General Trias, officially the City of General Trias, is a 1st class component city in the province of Cavite, Philippines. According to the 2020 census, it has a population of 450,583 people.

Etymology
During the earlier part of the Spanish colonial period, General Trias was often referred to as Las Estancias (the ranches), which was once a part of Cavite el Viejo, the present-day Kawit. It was also called Malabón Grande. The name Malabón was speculated to have been derived from either the local term "maraming labong," due to the abundance of bamboo shoots in the area, which is a main ingredient in Filipino cuisine; or from "mayabong," referring to the trees and other plants once abundant in the place.

At any rate, the first reference seems to be more probable because General Mariano Trías, a noted writer, adopted the nom de guerre "Labong," a word he often used in his writing and conversation. Grande, on the other hand, was affixed to the appellation because at the time, the place was a vast wilderness covering Sitio Tejero, frequently called by the revolutionary as Salinas (present-day Rosario), Santa Cruz de Malabón or Malabón el Chico (present-day Tanza) and Tierra Alta (present-day Noveleta). When the town was made independent from Cavite el Viejo, it was finally called by its popular name San Francisco de Malabón, in honor of patron saint, Saint Francis of Assisi.

History

First Cry of Cavite
The first uprising in Cavite known as the "First Cry of Cavite" occurred in San Francisco de Malabón about ten o’clock in the morning of August 31, 1896, when the town tribunal was attacked by Filipino revolutionaries led by Mariano Trías, Diego Mojica and Nicolas Portilla in Pasong Kalabaw (now known as Santa Clara). The second incident followed at twelve noon at Tierra Alta and the third in Cavite el Viejo between two and three o’clock in the afternoon.

Tejeros Convention
A chapter of the Katipunan known as Balangay Mapagtiis had already been in existence in the place for sometime. The Sangguniang Bayang Magdiwang headed by General Mariano Álvarez of Tierra Alta and the Sangguniang Bayang Mapagtiis of San Francisco de Malabón later merged under the name Magdiwang Council with General Alvarez as president. The Magdiwang Council hosted the Tejeros Convention on March 22, 1897, in a friar estate house in Sitio Tejero wherein Gen. Emilio Aguinaldo was elected president and Mariano Trías, then lieutenant general, as vice-president in a revolutionary government replacing the Katipunan.

Renaming
On February 28, 1914, Act No. 2390 was passed by the Philippine Assembly, changing the town's name to Malabón. On February 24, 1920, Act No. 2889 was approved, renaming the town after General Mariano Trías.

Cityhood

On August 19, 2015, President Benigno S. Aquino III signed Republic Act No. 10675 which converted the municipality of General Trias into a component city of Cavite. The bill finally came into full effect after majority of the city's residents voted yes to cityhood through a plebiscite. General Trias thus became the seventh city in the province and the 145th in the country.

Lone District of General Trias
On September 14, 2018, President Rodrigo Duterte signed Republic Act No. 11069, reapportioning the province of Cavite into eight legislative districts to make General Trias the province's sixth legislative district.

Geography
It straddles the northeastern part of the province. The city is surrounded by the municipalities of Rosario and Noveleta in the north, by Tanza and Trece Martires in the west, by Amadeo in the south, Silang in the southeast, and the cities of Dasmariñas and Imus to the east.

Climate

Barangays

General Trias is politically subdivided into 33 barangays:

Demographics

Religion
A vast majority of inhabitants are Roman Catholics while Protestanism is the second largest denomination in the city and some migrants from Mindanao practicing Islam.

Language
General Trias is one of the Hispanic cities in the Philippines because of these Spanish speakers are present in the city. Filipino, English and Spanish are the most used language in the area specially in Buenavista (also known as Camaren) because this has been the hide out of the Spaniards during the colonial period.

Economy

Government

Pursuant to Chapter II, Title II, Book III of Republic Act No. 7160 or the Local Government Code of 1991, the city government is to be composed of a mayor (alkalde), a vice mayor (bise alkalde) and members (kagawad) of the legislative branch Sangguniang Panlungsod alongside a secretary to the said legislature, all of which are elected to a three-year term and are eligible to run for three consecutive terms.

Executive

As with every Philippine city, the city mayor serves as General Trias' chief executive. Elected to a term of three years and limited to three consecutive terms, the mayor appoints the directors of each city department, which include the office of administration, engineering office, information office, legal office, and treasury office. The current mayor is Luis IV "Jon-Jon" Ferrer, brother of incumbent 6th District congressman Antonio Ferrer.

The city's vice mayor performs duties as acting mayor in the absence of the mayor. The vice mayor automatically succeeds as mayor upon the death of the incumbent, or if the mayor is unable to fulfil their duties. The vice mayor also convenes the Sangguniang Panlungsod, the city's legislative body. The current vice mayor is Jonas Glyn P. Labuguen.

Legislative
Within the city, the City Board or Sangguniang Panlungsod crafts all city ordinances, performs appropriation of city funds, issues franchises and permits, impose fees on city services, and exercise other duties and powers as stipulated by the Local Government Code of 1991.

Under R.A. 10675 Article V Section 10 (a). General Trias is entitled to a City Board composed of 10 members.

Economy

Industrial estates

General Trias has been gradually undergoing industrialization since the turn of the 21st century. Several major industrial estates, such as Gateway Business Park, a world class business community in Javalera and the New Cavite Industrial City (NCIC) in Manggahan, have chosen General Trias to be their home base.

The others are the Golden Gate Industrial Park (Phase I) in Buenavista II and Golden Gate Industrial Park (Phase II) in Panungyanan while the rest are found at Barangay Manggahan, Barangay San Francisco and along Governor's Drive.

Private subdivisions
General Trias is considered one of the new frontiers of growth and development in the Calabarzon area as attested by the giant industrial subdivisions located in the city. Many of these are in the highland barangay of Manggahan, located along Governor's Drive, the barangays of San Francisco, Santiago on the Arnaldo Highway, and barangay Pasong Camachille II on Open Canal Road.

Leisure and shopping malls 
Located at the Tejero intersection and opened in May 2016, the  Robinson's Place General Trias is Robinson's fourth shopping mall in the province and the first full-scale mall in General Trias.

On the southern part of the city, lies one of the biggest Golf and Country residential estate Eagle Ridge Golf and Country Club. It covers about 700 hectares, which makes it one of the largest residential estate in the Country. The Golf & Country Club, which is one of the component of Eagle Ridge development, is nearing its completion with three playable golf courses and two operational satellite clubhouses.

The  Eagle Ridge Residential expanse features a very upscale housing community, the integral component of the project will make up the whole concept of Eagle Ridge as a golf and residential site.

Since the fourth quarter of 2017, a number of shopping malls and areas are currently being built, including Vista Mall General Trias.

Festival
General Trias celebrates its Valenciana Festival every year. Valenciana, a variation of the Valencian paella, was first popularized in General Trias and became part of their culture.

Infrastructure

Local government projects
The master plan for General Trias is to achieve an agro-industrial and residential balance. 
The City of General Trias already have its recreational amenities like a Convention/Cultural Center, Sports Center, Sports Park w/ Grandstand (popular called Track 'n field), and a City Park at Barangay San Juan 2. Since its cityhood numerous renovation of public infrastructure are underway including the building of General Trias City Hall-Manggahan Annex and the takeover of the General Trias Medicare Hospital run by the provincial government  converted into the City of General Trias Medicare Hospital run by the city government. The road-widening activities conducted to fill the increasing number of vehicles that passed through its roads especially in Arnaldo Highway, Governor Ferrer Drive, Crisanto M. De Los Reyes Avenue, and Governor's Drive. It also invested on making Diversion Roads to ease traffic congestion problem and provides an easy and better access of transportation to its constituents who live in remote areas of the city like the road connecting Governor Ferrer Drive of Barangay Buenavista 1 to Arnaldo Highway of Barangay Santiago (Mayor's Drive).

Transportation
General Trias would soon be more accessible with the C-6 Expressway's construction connecting North and South Luzon and the Cavite–Laguna Expressway's development connecting CAVITEX to SLEX. The expansion of the LRT Line 6 from Bacoor to Dasmariñas would also provide fast access from General Trias to Metro Manila.

Healthcare
Several hospitals, both private and government-owned, have also sprouted throughout General Trias ranging from government health centers to private clinics to complete hospitals. GenTri Medical Center and Hospital Inc. and Gentri Doctors Medical Center to name a few are among the biggest hospitals in the entire province of Cavite.

Education

General Trias is home to several educational institutions, notably Lyceum of the Philippines University-Cavite campus, Cavite State University-General Trias campus, which was established in 2012, and the AMA Computer University located inside Ara Vista Village in Barangay Biclatan. Also in General Trias there are several private and public elementary and high schools which is supervised by its own DepEd City School Division.

Notable personalities

Mariano Trías (1868-1914), considered the first de facto Vice President of the revolutionary government established at the Tejeros Convention. The town was renamed in his honor after the Revolution.

Sister cities
  Tozawa, Yamagata, Japan

See also
List of renamed cities and municipalities in the Philippines

References

External links

 
 Official Website of the Provincial Government of Cavite
 [ Philippine Standard Geographic Code]
 Philippine Census Information

Cities in Cavite
Populated places established in 1748
Component cities in the Philippines